Paramoeba is a genus of common parasites, including species that can cause infection in fish, crabs (including the "blue crab", Callinectes sapidus), sea urchins and others.

References

Amoebozoa genera
Discosea